Hòutǔ or Hòutǔshén, also Hòutǔ Niángniáng (in Chinese either  or ), otherwise called Dimǔ or Dimǔ Niángniáng, is the deity of all land and earth in Chinese religion and mythology. Houtu is the overlord of all the Tu Di Gong ("Lord of Local Land"), Sheji ("the State"), Shan Shen ("God of Mountains"), Cheng Huang ("God of Local City") world wide.

In Taoism, Houtu is one the four Four heavenly ministers, which are four of the highest ranking gods in Taoism.

Role
Houtu was originally the god of all land and earth in early chinese mythology, before being absorbed into Daoism to be one of the Four heavenly ministers.

In early mythology
According to early chinese classic Zuo Zhuan (late 4th century BC), Book of Rites and Classic of Mountains and Seas, Houtu is the son of Gonggong, being able to control the flood by installing mountains of earth. He is also the assistant god to one of the Great Five Emperors, the Huang Di, being the god of the Earth element in Wuxing system.

In Daoism
In Daoism, Houtu is one of the Four heavenly ministers, along with Jade Emperor, Gouchen Emperor and Ziwei Emperor. In some daoism scripts, another two gods, Changsheng Emperor and Qinghua Emperor (青华大帝) are added to constitute "Six heavenly ministers" (六御) The Daochang of Houtu is at Mount Jiuhua.

Due to the belief that Tian (sky) represents yang and Di (earth) represents yin, most people believe Houtu is a female deity.

In Buddhism
Some scholars link Houtu to the Buddhist goddess Bhumi, which is the personification of Earth.

Worship
Houtu was first worshipped by Emperor Wen of Han (in Fenyin County, modern-day Wanrong County, Shanxi). Houtu was worshiped by Emperor Wu of Han in 113 BC.

Yellow River Map
Houtu is featured in some versions of the myth of the Great Flood of China: Yu did not do such a great job of channeling the Yellow River into the sea, dredging the wrong way. Sacred Mother Houtu then made the Yellow River Map and sent one of her divine messenger birds to tell Yu what to do; specifically, that he should open a channel to the east, to allow the right drainage.

Gallery

Notes

Works cited
Yang, Lihui, et al. (2005). Handbook of Chinese Mythology. New York: Oxford University Press.

Further reading

See also
Tian Di (天地)
Tu Di Gong (土地公)
Sheji (社稷)
Chinese spiritual world concepts

Deities in Taoism
Chinese goddesses
Earth goddesses

Four heavenly ministers